The Pardakoski–Kärnakoski took place on April 30, 1790 during Gustav III's Russian War, Sweden won over the Russian Empire.

The Swedish troops were in command of Gustaf Mauritz Armfelt and numbered about 1,400 men. The Russian troops numbered about 4,000 to 5,000 men and was commanded by Iosif Igelström. In the battle the Swedes lost 222 killed and wounded with another 17 men captured, the Russians lost 194 killed, 285 wounded with another 91 men captured.

References

Pardakoski-Kärnakoski
1790 in Europe
Pardakoski-Kärnakoski
Pardakoski-Kärnakoski
Pardakoski-Kärnakoski
History of South Karelia